The Fasanjas family (also spelled Fasanjus), was the name of a Persian noble-family which served the Buyid dynasty. The first member of the family was Abu'l-Fadl al-Abbas ibn Fasanjas, a rich nobleman native to Shiraz, who was in the service of the two Buyid brothers Imad al-Dawla and Mu'izz al-Dawla. He later died in 953 at the age 77.

References

Sources